Landhoo (Dhivehi: ލަންދޫ) is one of the inhabited islands of Southern Miladhunmadulhu Atoll, administrative code Noonu Atoll.

History

Archaeology
This island has large ruins from the historical Maldivian Buddhist era. On the northwest side of the island there is an ancient mound known as "Maabadhige Haitha" by the local people. This is the ruins of a Buddhist Stupa. The diameter of the mound is 292 feet and the height is 28 feet.

The remains in this island are probably the single most important Buddhist ruins in the Northern region of the Maldives.

Geography

Demography

References

 Divehi Tārīkhah Au Alikameh. Divehi Bahāi Tārikhah Khidmaiykurā Qaumī Markazu. Reprint 1958 edn. Malé 1990. 
 Divehiraajjege Jōgrafīge Vanavaru. Muhammadu Ibrahim Lutfee. G.Sōsanī.
 

Islands of the Maldives